Sony 3CCD-VX3 (often referred to as simply VX-3) was a Hi-8 camcorder noteworthy for being the first to feature dichroic (prismatic) imaging.  It was released to the North American market in 1992 at a street cost of about US$3500.  The PAL version as well as the Japanese version had the model name CCD-VX1.

The image is created using three 1/3" CCD chips by prismatically splitting the optics into red, green, and blue, and processing each of these channels individually; this preserves quality especially with red hues.  The camera imaged in 410,000 pixels with horizontal resolution of better than 530 lines.

During the mid-1990s, Sony dropped Hi-8 in favor of the emerging DV format, and as a result the VX-3 was discontinued in September 1995.  However the VX-3 went on to serve as the framework for a line of professional DV cameras, including the DCR-VX1000, DCR-VX9000, and DSR-200.

External links
 Sony CCD-VX1 (Official webpage)

CCD-VX3
CCD-VX3
Audiovisual introductions in 1993